Antonino Caltabiano (born 21 April 1955 in Catania) is an Italian former wrestler who competed in the 1976 Summer Olympics, in the 1980 Summer Olympics, and in the 1984 Summer Olympics.

References

External links
 

1955 births
Living people
Sportspeople from Catania
Olympic wrestlers of Italy
Wrestlers at the 1976 Summer Olympics
Wrestlers at the 1980 Summer Olympics
Wrestlers at the 1984 Summer Olympics
Italian male sport wrestlers
21st-century Italian people
20th-century Italian people
World Wrestling Championships medalists